"Worship You" is a song recorded by American country music singer Kane Brown. It was released on October 26, 2020 as the fourth single from his third EP Mixtape, Vol. 1. The song was written by Brown, Matt McGinn, Alexander Izquierdo and Ryan Vojtesak, and produced by Dann Huff.

Background
Brown released "Worship You" for his wife, Katelyn Jae, and celebrated their first wedding anniversary. "Worship You" depicted Brown's belief in their love, liked he believed the Bible. In ABC's interview, Brown headlined the memories: "When we were writing it, we really didn't know what to write about. I think we tried like four different songs before we wrote that song... But I remember us writing it. It came, you know, so fluent. We actually wrote it pretty fast."

Brown continuous description: "Everything that we threw out, it was literally kind of like that we were in church, you know. Everything that we said: 'down on my knees praying,' 'If you were religion, I'd worship you.'"

Music video
The music video was released on October 31, 2020, directed by Alex Alvga. It was filmed in the mountain forests of Jackson Hole, Wyoming, and starred Brown's wife Katelyn and their young daughter, Kingsley.

Live performance
On October 21, 2020. Brown debuted the song "Worship You" on TV at the 2020 CMT Music Awards, held on Bicentennial Capitol Mall State Park in Nashville.

Charts

Weekly charts

Year-end charts

References

2020 singles
2020 songs
Kane Brown songs
Songs written by Kane Brown
Songs written by Matt McGinn (songwriter)
Song recordings produced by Dann Huff
RCA Records Nashville singles
Country ballads